Magomed Imranovich Abdulaev (18 June 1961 – 5 January 2023) was a Russian lawyer and politician, who served as the  from 2010 to 2013.

Prior to entering politics, Abdulaev was a lawyer.

Biography  
Abdulaev was a graduate of Dagestan State University.

A member of the ruling United Russia party, he rose to the second-highest position in Dagestan by 2010.

Abdulaev died while crossing a road in the Dagestani capital of Makhachkala on 5 January 2023, aged 61.

References

1961 births
2023 deaths
Russian lawyers
Russian politicians
United Russia politicians
Recipients of the Order of Honour (Russia)
People from Gunibsky District
Road incident deaths in Russia